The Canary Yellow Bicycle is a Greek film directed by Dimitris Stavrakas. It released in 1999 and it stars Dimitris Alexandris. The film won the second best film award and the award of the best leading actor in the Greek State Film Awards.

Plot
A young teacher is appointed to a primary school. He takes on the larger class and soon he ascertains that one pupil even doesn't know writing and reading. The older teachers in the school, believes that this boy is too weak, but the teacher perceives that the pupil just has some learning difficulties and he could improve with special education. The teacher offers him private tutoring where he applies special methods and he manages to improve the pupil. However his effort isn't easy because neither the family of the boy (family with low education) nor his colleagues (old, traditional teachers) in the school support him.

Cast
Dimitris Alexandris 	
Yorgos Halaris 	
Manos Vakousis	
Thanos Grammenos 	
Nikos Georgakis

Awards

References

External links

Greek drama films
1999 films